During the 1994–95 English football season, Watford F.C. competed in the Football League First Division.

Season summary
Before the start of the 1994–95 season, the Hornets were bookmakers' favourites for relegation but after a shaky start, Roeder's team proved critics wrong by challenging for a play-off place and never were in danger of being dragged into a relegation battle but in the end, inconsistency on their travels cost them a play-off place and had to settle for a 7th place finish.

Final league table

Results
Watford's score comes first

Legend

Football League First Division

FA Cup

League Cup

Players

First-team squad
Squad at end of season

References

Notes

Watford F.C. seasons
Watford